The Frank Zappa AAAFNRAAA Birthday Bundle 2008 was released as a digital download on iTunes on December 21, 2008. It consists of five previously unreleased tracks performed by Frank Zappa, and new tracks featuring Zappa's children, producer Joe Travers and others. It is the second iTunes album by Frank Zappa, the first being The Frank Zappa AAAFNRAA Birthday Bundle (2006). (AAAFNRAA stands for "Anything Anytime Anywhere for No Reason At All", Zappa's motto of sorts.) The additional A in this release's title stands for "Again".

Track listing
"Dancin' Fool" (Disco Version) - 6:18 (Frank Zappa)
Artist: Frank Zappa
Producer: Frank Zappa
Originally released April 1979 on a 12” single. Released in 1995 by Rykodisc on Strictly Commercial
"More Trouble Every Day" - 5:48 (Frank Zappa)
Artist: Frank Zappa
Producer: Frank Zappa
Recorded live in Wien, Austria, May 8, 1988
"Gorgeous Inca" - 3:25 (Frank Zappa)
 Artist: Frank Zappa
Producer: Frank Zappa
Recorded live in Graz, Austria, March 23, 1979
"Ancient Armaments" - 4:09 (Frank Zappa)
Artist: Frank Zappa 
Producer: Frank Zappa 
Originally released as a B-side to the single "I Don’t Want To Get Drafted". Recorded live in New York City, October 31, 1978
"America the Beautiful" - 3:35 (Traditional)
Artist: Frank Zappa 
Producer: Frank Zappa 
Recorded live in Uniondale, New York, March 25, 1988
"You're a Mean One, Mr. Grinch" - 3:12 (Dr. Seuss & Albert Hague)
 Artist: Dweezil Zappa with Ahmet Zappa (vocals)
Producer: Dweezil Zappa 
Originally released in 2000 on the Dweezil Zappa CD Automatic
"Saturday Girl" - 2:50 (Dweezil Zappa)
Artist: Dweezil Zappa 
Producer: Dweezil Zappa 
"Alice" - 5:12
Artist: Diva Zappa 
Producer: Dweezil Zappa
"Espanoza" - 3:26
Artist: Diva Zappa
Producer: Dweezil Zappa
"Dumb All Over" - 5:46 (Frank Zappa)
Artist: Melanie Starks
Producer: Joe Travers
"Twenty Small Cigars" - 5:49 (Frank Zappa)
Artist: Joe Travers
Producer: Joe Travers
"Lacksadaisial" - 5:44 (Joe Travers)
Artist: Joe Travers
Producer: Joe Travers
"Dirty Love" - 4:04 (Frank Zappa)
Artist: Cree Summer 
Ahmet Zappa (background vocals) & Dweezil Zappa (guitar)
Producer: Linda Perry

References

External links
 Official Zappa website - album info
 

Compilation albums published posthumously
ITunes-exclusive releases
Frank Zappa compilation albums
2008 compilation albums
Zappa Records albums